Kinder is the German word for "children"; it may also refer to:

Businesses
Kinder, a trademark of Ferrero, an Italian confectioner:
Kinder Surprise 
Kinder Chocolate bars
Kinder Happy Hippo
Kinder Bueno
Kinder Joy
Kinder Morgan Energy Partners, a United States energy company

Places

United Kingdom
Kinder Scout, a moorland plateau in Northern England
Kinder, Derbyshire, a township in the ancient parish of Glossop in England
The River Kinder, a tributary of the River Sett, Derbyshire

United States
Kinder, Indiana, a village
Kinder, Louisiana, a town
Kinder, Missouri, an unincorporated community
Kinder, West Virginia, an unincorporated community

People
 Kinder (surname)

Other uses
Kinder (goat), a breed of goat
, a British coastal tanker
Virtus Pallacanestro Bologna, known as Kinder Bologna between 1996 and 2002
Kinder Foundation, non-profit organisation, gives grants to projects based in Houston, Texas

See also
"Kinder, Küche, Kirche", a German slogan
Wunderkind
Kindergarten